Norma Dunning (born 1959) is an Inuk Canadian writer and assistant lecturer at the University of Alberta, who won the Danuta Gleed Literary Award in 2018 for her short story collection Annie Muktuk and Other Stories. In the same year, she won the Writers' Guild of Alberta's Howard O'Hagan Award for the short story "Elipsee", and was a shortlisted finalist for the City of Edmonton Book Award. She published in 2020 a collection of poetry and stories entitled Eskimo Pie: A Poetics of Inuit Identity.

Of Inuit descent, Dunning was born in Quebec and raised in a variety of towns as her father was a member of the Canadian military. She is based in Edmonton, Alberta, where she completed her doctoral degree with Indigenous Peoples Education at the University of Alberta in June 2019.

Her story collection Tainna (pronounced Da-ee-nna) won the Governor General's Award for English-language fiction at the 2021 Governor General's Awards, and was shortlisted for the ReLit Award for short fiction in 2022. Her second book Akia: The Other Side, is a collection of poetry that honors Inuit who lay in the past.

References

1959 births
21st-century Canadian short story writers
Canadian women short story writers
Inuit writers
Canadian Inuit women
Writers from Edmonton
Living people
21st-century Canadian women writers
Governor General's Award-winning fiction writers